Bidau Santana is a suco in Cristo Rei Administrative Post, Dili Municipality, East Timor. The administrative area covers an area of 1.84 square kilometres and at the time of the 2015 census it had a population of 6,482 people.

Geography
Bidau Santana is located to the west of the Cristo Rei Administrative Post, at the east end of the Bay of Dili. Northeast lies Meti Aut, east of the Camea and south of Becora and Culu Hun. To the west, beyond Mota Bidau, is the administrative office of Nain Feto, to which Bidau Santana belonged to until 2004. Becora is bordered by the Benamauc River, which forms the Mota Claran together with the Rio Bemori and flows into the Bay of Dili.

Bidau Santana is divided into four Aldeias. Bidau Mota Claran, Manu Mata and Toko Baru to the west and Sagrada Familia to the east, occupying more than two-thirds of the Suco's area. A distinction is also made between the aldeias of Bidau Santana on the coast and Mota Claran in the southwest and Masau in the center. In the suco, there is a primary school in Masau, the Escola Primaria No. 2 Bidau Masau. Two Marian grottos with additional extensions are striking: the Gruta de Bidau Masau and the Gruta de Bidau Santana. In 2019, the B. J. Habibie Bridge was inaugurated and the Jardim B.J. Habibie park opened next to it.

References

Populated places in Dili District
Sucos of East Timor